Ketoprak may refer to:

 Ketoprak, a traditional theater genre of Java, similar to wayang wong
 Ketoprak (dish), a Jakartan and West Javanese vegetarian dish of fried tahu, bihun, cucumber and bean sprout, served in peanut sauce, similar to Gado-gado 
 Ketoprak Humor, an Indonesian comedy TV show on RCTI
 It is also an Indonesian name for the fish Belontia hasselti

Indonesian comedy